Werner Drechsler (17 January 1917 – 12 March 1944) was a German U-boat crewman during World War II. When he was taken prisoner he enthusiastically cooperated with his captors, likely since his father had been sent to a Nazi concentration camp as a political prisoner.

Eventually, United States Navy intelligence officers recruited Drechsler as a spy and placed him in a prisoner of war (POW) camp near Fort Meade, Maryland with other U-boat sailors. After arrival, Drechsler worked undercover, befriending his fellow POWs in order to collect information regarding German submarine technology, operational procedures and tactics and any other intelligence which could be useful to the Allies.

On 12 March 1944 Drechsler was transferred to a different POW camp in Arizona which was filled mainly with other submariners of the Kriegsmarine. This transfer took place even though Drechsler was supposed to be kept segregated from other naval prisoners, particularly his former crewmates on the U-118, who were aware of Drechsler's spying activities. Drechsler's transfer to Arizona quickly had fatal results: some members of the U-118 were confined at the camp and they immediately recognised their former crewmate. Word of Drechsler's undercover activities spread rapidly through the camp, and a kangaroo court was convened while Drechsler was asleep. The other prisoners eventually decided it was necessary to kill Drechsler to ensure he could no longer spy upon them, and also to act as a deterrent for any other POWs who might consider collaborating with the enemy. The next morning, Drechsler was found hanging in the shower room.

Seven men (Helmut Fischer, Fritz Franke, Günter Külsen, Heinrich Ludwig, Bernhard Reyak, Otto Stengel and Rolf Wizny) were tried by a general court-martial and executed for the beating and hanging of Drechsler. In the last mass execution in the United States, the men were hanged on 25 August 1945 at Fort Leavenworth, Kansas.

A review board had recommended that two other German POWs, Siegfried Elser and Friedrich Murza, face charges as accessories before the fact to Drechsler's murder. However, they never stood trial.

See also 
Prisoner of war
Prisoner-of-war camp
List of people executed by the United States military

References 
 Richard Whittingham, Martial Justice: The Last Mass Execution in the United States, Naval Institute Press, 1997

External links 
 A community college historical website which explains the Werner Drechsler story in detail
 website which follows history channel program about the mass execution
 A number of photographs taken around the time of Drechsler's capture

1917 births
1944 deaths
Kriegsmarine personnel of World War II
Submariners
German prisoners of war in World War II held by the United States
German people who died in prison custody
Prisoners who died in United States military detention
Prisoners murdered in custody
German people murdered abroad
Deaths by hanging
Lynching deaths in Arizona
Male murder victims